National Arts Council is the name of a number of national bodies which oversee government funding of the arts.

Australia Council for the Arts
National Culture Fund of Bulgaria
Canada Council
Cayman National Cultural Foundation
Arts Council England
Arts Council of Finland
Arts Council of Great Britain
Arts Council of Ireland
Creative New Zealand
Pakistan National Council of the Arts
National Commission for Culture and the Arts of the Philippines
Scottish Arts Council
National Arts Council (Singapore)
National Arts Council of South Africa
National Council for the Traditional Arts, United States
National Council on Education for the Ceramic Arts, United States
National Arts Council of Tanzania
Arts Council of Wales
National Arts Council of Zimbabwe

See also
Arts council